In Power Kills: Democracy as a Method of Nonviolence by American political scientist Rudolph Rummel (1997), a sequel to his 1994 book Death by Government argues that the more power a government has, the more it tends to kill its own citizens and make war on other countries, and conversely, the less power a government has over its citizens, the less it tends to kill them or to launch wars of aggression, proposing that democracy is the form of government least likely to commit democide.

See also
Democide
Rudolph Rummel
Rummel's Law

References
 Power Kills: Democracy as a Method of Nonviolence by R.J. Rummel (New Brunswick, N.J.: Transaction Books, 1997); 246 pages

External links
https://www.hawaii.edu/powerkills/NOTE6.HTM
Review - by Richard M. Ebeling, November 1, 1997
Review - Armed Forces and Society
2002 paperback edition online

1997 non-fiction books
Political books